Elgy F. Gillespie (born 1950) is an English-born Irish journalist and author.

Early life
Gillespie was born in London in 1950, to a Belfast father and an Anglo-German mother. She came to Dublin aged 17, reading English at Trinity College, Dublin.

Career
Gillespie wrote for The Irish Times between 1971 and 1986, for columns including "Women First".

Personal life
Gillespie left Ireland in 1986, and has lived in the U.S. since, mostly in San Francisco.

In 2018, she received treatment for an oligodendroglioma.

Bibliography

Irish topics
The Flat-Dweller's Companion (1972)
The Liberties of Dublin (1973; editor)
The Country Life Picture Book of Ireland (1982)
Portraits of the Irish (1986, with Liam Blake)
Changing The Times: Irish Women Journalists 1969-1981 (2003; editor)
Vintage Nell: The McCafferty Reader (2005; editor)
Irish Theater Is Alive and Flourishing (2013)

Food writing
You Say Potato! (2001)
The Rough Guide to San Francisco Restaurants (2003)

References

1950 births
Irish women journalists
Irish feminists
The Irish Times people
Alumni of Trinity College Dublin
Living people
Irish people of German descent